The Erivan K. Haub School of Business is the business school of Saint Joseph's University, located in Philadelphia, Pennsylvania. Founded in 1927, the school was named in honor of noted German businessman Erivan Haub in 1988 in recognition of his long-time financial support of business programs at the university.

Rankings 
The Haub School of Business was recognized by Beyond Grey Pinstripes, a biennial survey of business schools, for being one of the top 100 schools in the world at integrating ethical issues into graduate business curricula in 2009 and 2010.

Business school 
 11th in the northeast, U.S. News & World Report.
 94th in the nation, Bloomberg Businessweek.
 Among the "Best 295 Business Schools" in 2016, The Princeton Review.

Undergraduate 
 1st in the nation for undergraduate programs in risk management and insurance, U.S. News & World Report.
 8th in the nation for undergraduate programs in marketing, U.S. News & World Report.
 10th in the nation for undergraduate programs in accounting, U.S. News & World Report.

Graduate 
 1st overall in the Philadelphia region, U.S. News & World Report.
 3rd among executive MBA programs in the United States, U.S. News & World Report.
 14th in the nation for graduate programs in marketing, U.S. News & World Report.
 17th in the nation for graduate programs in finance, U.S. News & World Report.
 59th in the nation among online MBA programs, U.S. News & World Report.

Beta Gamma Sigma 
From the Beta Gamma Sigma Honor Society:
 Silver Chapter Award, 2006, 2007, 2008
 Gold Chapter Award, 2010

Mandeville Hall
The Haub School is based in Mandeville Hall, located on the main campus of Saint Joseph's University. Completed in 1998, the facility represented a major expansion of classrooms and laboratory facilities for business students at the university. Uniquely, Mandeville Hall hosts one of only 15 Wall Street trading rooms among all business schools in the United States. The room provides access to electronic sources of financial and investment data, analytical tools, and trading simulations. Students in certain classes must trade stocks to prepare themselves for specific careers. The centerpiece of Mandeville Hall is a 300-seat, state-of-the-art "Teletorium" (a term trademarked by SJU).

Academics 
In Pennsylvania, the Haub School of Business is one of only four business schools to have both its accounting program and business program accredited by the Association to Advance Collegiate Schools of Business.

Undergraduate programs 
 Accounting
 Business Administration
 Business Intelligence and Analytics
 Entertainment Marketing
 Family Business and Entrepreneurship
 Finance
 Food Marketing
 International Business
 Leadership, Ethics and Organizational Sustainability
 Machine Learning for Business Applications
 Managing Human Capital
 Marketing
 Pharmaceutical & Healthcare Marketing
 Risk Management and Insurance
 Sports Marketing

Graduate programs 
 M.S., Business Intelligence and Analytics
 M.S., Financial Services
 M.S., International Marketing
 M.S., Managing Human Capital
 M.B.A., Food Marketing (Executive)
 M.B.A., Pharmaceutical & Healthcare Marketing (Executive)
 Master of Business Administration
 Accounting
 Business Intelligence and Analytics
 Finance
 General M.B.A.
 Health and Medical Services Administration
 International Business
 International Marketing
 Leadership
 Managing Human Capital
 Marketing

Publishing 
The Haub School of Business publishes the HSB Review every semester. The publication outlines the achievements and goals of the college, including ongoing research, success in business school rankings, student achievements, and new initiatives being undertaken by the school's faculty. The HSB Review is available both online and in print, and is made available to current students as well as Haub School alumni.

Academic Centers

Pedro Arrupe Center for Business Ethics 
The Pedro Arrupe Center for Business Ethics is "an intellectual resource for business ethics in both academic and business contexts." It serves as a resource for the ethical conduct of business and it also serves to integrate ethics education into business disciplines.

Center For Consumer Research 
The Center For Consumer Research is a center that uses research and seminars to understand the needs and concerns of consumers.

Academy of Risk Management and Insurance 
The Academy of Risk Management and Insurance promotes and supports the concept of risk management and insurance education and provides services to risk management and insurance students.

Notable alumni
Daniel J. Hilferty III - President and CEO of Independence Blue Cross.

References

Saint Joseph's University
Business schools in Pennsylvania
Educational institutions established in 1927
Universities and colleges in Philadelphia
West Philadelphia
1927 establishments in Pennsylvania